The 2023 Louisiana Attorney General election will take place on October 14, 2023, to elect the next attorney general of Louisiana. Incumbent Republican Attorney General Jeff Landry is retiring to run for governor.

Under Louisiana's jungle primary system, all candidates will appear on the same ballot, regardless of party, and voters may vote for any candidate, regardless of their party affiliation.

Republican candidates

Candidates

Declared 
 John Stefanski, state representative
Marty Maley, attorney, former assistant district attorney for the 18th judicial district, and candidate for attorney general in 2015
Liz Murrill, Louisiana Solicitor General

Declined 
Jeff Landry, incumbent attorney general (running for governor)
Tanner Magee, speaker pro tempore of the Louisiana House of Representatives (ran for 1st Circuit Court of Appeal judgeship)

Endorsements

Democrats

Candidates

Potential
Hillar Moore, East Baton Rouge Parish district attorney

Independents

Candidates

Declared
John Belton, district attorney for the 3rd judicial district

Polling

References

External links 

 Official campaign websites
John Belton (I) for Attorney General
Marty Maley (R) for Attorney General
Liz Murrill (R) for Attorney General
 John Stefanski (R) for Attorney General

Attorney General
Louisiana
Louisiana Attorney General elections
Louisiana